Nusay or Nusai is a village in Nusay District, Badakhshan Province, northeastern Afghanistan.

See also
Badakhshan Province

References

External links
Satellite map at Maplandia.com

Populated places in Nusay District
Villages in Afghanistan